Betula szechuanica, the Sichuan birch or Szechuan birch, is a birch species native to Sichuan, China, conical in shape, growing to 20 meters in height, with white bark, yellow-green male catkins or green female catkins, and dark, blue-green leaves.

Synonyms 
 Betula platyphylla var. szechuanica
 Betula mandshurica var. szechuanica
 Betula japonica var. szechuanica

References

 GBIF entry
 Alison Hoblyn and Marie O'Hara, Green Flowers: Unexpected Beauty for the Garden, Container Or Vase, page 40, Timber Press, 2009. .

szechuanica